Vasilissa (Greek: Βασίλισσα) is the fourth studio album by Greek singer Eleni Foureira and her first album release with Panik Records. The album was released on 11 December 2017. The album is certified platinum in Greece. The album was reissued twice in 2018, once as Fuego (titled after Foureira's 2018 Eurovision entry "Fuego", which finished in second place in the competition) and later as Vasilissa (Platinum Edition).

Re-editions

Fuego 
The first re-edition of the Vasilissa album was called Fuego, with Foureira's song "Fuego", her entry at the 2018 Eurovision Song Contest competing for Cyprus, and its instrumental and karaoke versions added. The re-edition was released on May 24, 2018. This version has not been uploaded to any streaming services, however, all songs are available to stream.

Vasilissa (Platinum Edition) 
Vasilissa (Platinum Edition) is the second re-edition of the album and was released on 17 December 2018, following the platinum certification of the original album. It includes her Eurovision Song Contest 2018 hit song "Fuego", her 2018 summer hit "Caramela" as well as her Christmas song, "2019 S'Agapo", a re-edition of "2018 S'Agapo" (which was included in the standard edition of Vasilissa).  Additionally, the "Fuego" (Spanish version) and the "Fuego" (Playmen Festival Remix) were included as well, bringing the song total of the album to 16. The standard edition has 11 tracks on its digital form and 12 in its physical form as her song, "Send For Me" with AM Sniper and Afro B is included on the physical CD. This version is so far only available in its physical form, as Eleni Foureira's label, Panik Records, has not uploaded this version of the album to any streaming services of now. All songs from the album have however been released and are available to stream from their individual releases as singles.

Track listings

Music videos

Lyric videos

Live performances

Certifications 

|Greece (IFPI)
|Platinum
|-

Release history

References 

2017 albums
Panik Records albums
Eleni Foureira albums